Gurupi Biological Reserve is a biological reserve in the State of Maranhão, in Brazil.

Location

The Gurupi Biological Reserve covers parts of the municipalities of Centro Novo do Maranhão and Bom Jardim in the state of Maranhão.
The reserve covers parts of the watersheds of the Gurupí and Pindaré rivers.
The vegetation is dense Amazon rainforest within the Centro de Endemismos Belém ecoregion, and is rich in species of flora.

History

The Gurupi Biological Reserve was created on 12 January 1988.
The reserve is administered by the Chico Mendes Institute for Biodiversity Conservation.
The Biological Reserve is a "strict nature reserve" under IUCN protected area category Ia.
The purpose is full preservation of biota and other natural attributes without human intervention.
Specifically the reserve maintains a representative sample of the Amazon rainforest in Maranhão.
The reserve is supported by the Amazon Region Protected Areas Program.
The proposed South Amazon Ecological Corridor would link the reserve to other protected areas and indigenous territories in the region.

Status

Studies with plants, butterflies and birds classify this biological reserve as one of the 12 pleistocenic refuges in the Brazilian Amazon rainforest.
It has lost more than half of its forest due to logging since its creation.
Protected species are Kaapori capuchin (Cebus kaapori), oncilla (Leopardus tigrinus), ocelot (Leopardus pardalis), jaguar (Panthera onca), Belem curassow (Crax pinima), Amazonian barred woodcreeper (Dendrocolaptes certhia), black-spotted bare-eye (Phlegopsis nigromaculata), red-necked aracari (Pteroglossus bitorquatus), dark-winged trumpeter (Psophia viridis) and pearly parakeet (Pyrrhura lepida).

References

Sources

1988 establishments in Brazil
Biological reserves of Brazil
Protected areas of Maranhão
Protected areas established in 1988